Differences in pronunciation between American English (AmE) and British English (BrE) can be divided into
 differences in accent (i.e. phoneme inventory and realisation). See differences between General American and Received Pronunciation for the standard accents in the United States and Britain; for information about other accents see regional accents of English speakers.
 differences in the pronunciation of individual words in the lexicon (i.e. phoneme distribution). In this article, transcriptions use Received Pronunciation (RP) to represent BrE and General American (GAm) to represent AmE.
In the following discussion:
 superscript A2 after a word indicates that the BrE pronunciation of the word is a common variant in AmE.
 superscript B2 after a word indicates that the AmE pronunciation of the word is a common variant in BrE.
 superscript A1 after a word indicates that the pronunciation given as BrE is also the most common variant in AmE.
 superscript B1 after a word indicates that the pronunciation given as AmE is also the most common variant in BrE.

Stress

French stress
For many loanwords from French, AmE has final-syllable stress, while BrE stresses an earlier syllable. French loanwords that differ in stress only are listed below.

Verbs ending in -ate
Most 2-syllable verbs ending in -ate have first-syllable stress in AmE and second-syllable stress in BrE. This includes castrate, collate, cremateA2, curate, dictateA2, donateA2, frustrate, gestate, gradate, gyrate, hydrate, locateA2, migrate, mutate, narratebA2, notate, phonate, placatebB2, prostrate, pulsate, rotate, serrateA2, spectate, stagnate, striate, translateA2, truncate, vacateb*A2, vibrateA2. Examples where AmE and BrE match include conflate, create, debate, equate, elate, inflate, negate; and mandate and probate with first-syllable stress. Derived nouns in -ator retain the distinction, but those in -ation do not. Also, migratoryB2 and vibratoryB2 sometimes retain the distinction.

Most longer -ate verbs are pronounced the same in AmE and BrE, but a few have first-syllable stress in BrE and second-syllable stress in AmE: elongateaA2, impregnate, inculcate, inculpate, infiltrateA2, remonstrateabA2, sequestrate, tergiversateaA1. For some derived adjectives ending -atory stress-shifting to -a(tory)- occurs in BrE. Among these cases are celebratorya, compensatorya, participatorya, regulatoryaB1. AmE stresses the same syllable as the corresponding -ate verb (except compensatory, where AmE stresses the second syllable). A further -atory difference is laboratoryB2: AmE  and BrE .

Miscellaneous stress
There are a number of cases where same-spelled noun, verb and/or adjective have uniform stress in one dialect but distinct stress in the other (e.g. alternate, prospect): see initial-stress-derived noun.

The following table lists words not brought up in the discussion so far where the main difference between AmE and BrE is in stress. Usually, it also follows a reduction of the unstressed vowel. Words marked with subscript A or B are exceptions to this, and thus retains a full vowel in the (relatively) unstressed syllable of AmE or BrE. A subsequent asterisk, *, means that the full vowel is usually retained; a preceding * means that the full vowel is sometimes retained.

Words with other points of difference are listed in a later table.

Affixes

-ary, -ery, -ory, -mony, -ative, -bury, -berry

Exceptions include library, primaryA2, rosemary.

The suffix -berry is pronounced by similar rules, except that in BrE it may be full  after an unstressed syllable, while in AmE it is usually full in all cases. Thus we have strawberry: BrE , AmE , and whortleberry: BrE/AmE .

The placename component  (e.g. Canterbury) has a similar difference: AmE has a full vowel:  where BrE has a reduced one: .

-ile
Words ending in unstressed  derived from Latin adjectives ending  are mostly pronounced with a full vowel in BrE  but a reduced vowel or syllabic L in AmE  (e.g. fertile rhymes with fur tile in BrE but with furtle in AmE).

AmE will (unlike BrE, except when indicated withB2) have a reduced last vowel:
 generally in facile, (in)fertile, fissile, fragile, missile, stabile (adjective), sterile, tensile, versatile, virile, volatile
 usually in agile, docile, decile, ductile, futile, hostile, juvenile, (im)mobile (adjective and phone), puerile, tactile
 rarely in domicileB2, erectile, febrileA2, infantile, nubile, pensile, percentile, projectile, reptile, senileA2, servile, textile, utile
 never in crocodile, exile, gentile, reconcile; nor to compounds of monosyllables (e.g. turnstile from stile)

In some words the pronunciation  also comes into play:

 BrE , AmE : A2, mercantileA2, mobile/stabile (decorations)
 BrE , AmE  or : motile, prehensile, pulsatile, tractile
 BrE , AmE  or : imbecile
 BrE , AmE : rutile (BrE, AmE also )

di-

-ine
The suffix -ine, when unstressed, is pronounced sometimes  (e.g. feline), sometimes  (e.g. morphine) and sometimes  (e.g. medicine). Some words have variable pronunciation within BrE, or within AmE, or between BrE and AmE.

BrE , AmE (1) : carbineA2, FlorentineA2,  internecineA2, philistineA2, pristineB2, salineA2, serpentineA2.

BrE , AmE (1)  (2) : adamantineA2.

BrE , AmE : uterineB2.

BrE , AmE (1)  (2)  (3) : crystalline, labyrinthine.

BrE (1) , AmE (1)  (2) : strychnineA2.

Effects of the weak vowel merger
The weak vowel merger causes affixes such as -ate (as in climate), be- (before a consonant), de- (as in decide), -ed (with a sounded vowel), -es (with a sounded vowel), -est, -less, -ness, pre- (as in prepare) and re- (before a consonant) to be pronounced with the schwa  (the a in about), rather than the unstressed  (found in the second syllable of locksmith). This variation is denoted with the symbol  in some of the dictionaries published by Oxford University Press and in the Routledge Dictionary of Pronunciation of Current English. In the latter, the British pronunciation of climate is transcribed , though carelessness is transcribed .

Weak forms
The title Saint before a person's name has a weak form in BrE but not AmE:
before vowels, .

Miscellaneous pronunciation differences

These tables list words pronounced differently but spelled the same. See also the table of words with different pronunciation reflected in the spelling.

Single differences 
Words with multiple points of difference of pronunciation are in the table after this one. Accent-based differences are ignored. Also, tiara is listed with AmE ; the marry–merry–Mary merger changes this vowel for many Americans.

Even though it is not phonemic, vowel length in GA works in a very similar manner to RP, so this is mainly a difference in transcription.

Multiple differences

Notes

References

Further reading
Celce-Murcia, M., Brinton, D. M., & Goodwin, J. M. (2010). Teaching pronunciation: A reference and course text (2nd ed.). Cambridge University Press.

Pronunciation